Nanako Takushi (Takushi Nanako, 澤岻奈々子, born 25 March 1976) is a J-pop singer from Okinawa, Japan, and an original member of the group Super Monkey's.  After the group disbanded, she formed the group MAX with other Super Monkey's vocalists.

See also 
 Super Monkey's
 MAX

References 

1976 births
Living people
People from Okinawa Prefecture
Musicians from Okinawa Prefecture
21st-century Japanese singers
21st-century Japanese women singers